LYPLA3, also known as Group XV phospholipase A2, is an enzyme that in humans is encoded by the PLA2G15 gene.

Lysophospholipases are enzymes that act on biological membranes to regulate the multifunctional lysophospholipids. The protein encoded by this gene hydrolyzes lysophosphatidylcholine to glycerophosphorylcholine and a free fatty acid. This enzyme is present in the plasma and thought to be associated with high-density lipoprotein. A later paper contradicts the function of this gene. It demonstrates that this gene encodes a lysosomal enzyme instead of a lysophospholipase and has both calcium-independent phospholipase A2 and transacylase activities.

References

Further reading